Giovanni Zarrella (born 4 March 1978 in Hechingen) is a German-Italian singer and television presenter based in Germany. He was a singer on the pop group Bro'Sis from 2001 to 2006.

He was one of an "international" sextet, later quintet, of singers formed from the TV series Popstars. Previously a youth footballer in Italy and Germany, after the disbanding of Bro'Sis, Zarrella took part in TV celebrity football events and subsequently became a TV sports presenter.

Discography 
 Coming Up (2006)
 Musica (2008)
 Ancora Musica (2010)
 La vita è bella (2019)
 Ciao! (2021)
 PER SEMPRE (2022)

References 

1978 births
Living people
21st-century German male singers
German people of Italian descent
German-language singers of Italy